Frank William Gordon Deighton (21 May 1927 – 23 February 2018) was a Scottish amateur golfer. He won one of the leading Scottish amateur golfers of the 1950s.

As an individual, he won the Scottish Amateur twice, in 1956 and 1959. He represented Great Britain and Ireland in two Walker Cup matches, in 1951 and 1957, and also in the Commonwealth Tournament in 1954 and 1959.

Deighton was a GP.

Amateur wins
1956 Scottish Amateur
1959 Scottish Amateur

Team appearances
Walker Cup (representing Great Britain & Ireland): 1951, 1957
Commonwealth Tournament (representing Great Britain): 1954, 1959
Amateurs–Professionals Match (representing the Amateurs): 1956, 1957

References

Scottish male golfers
Amateur golfers
People from Alexandria, West Dunbartonshire
Sportspeople from West Dunbartonshire
1927 births
2018 deaths